Scaevola amblyanthera is a small shrub (to 0.7 m high) in the family Goodeniaceae which is found in tropical and central Australia.

Description
Its leaves are sessile (having no stem), and are elliptic to obovate, with margins which are usually toothed (dentate). They are from 8–30 mm long by 2–9 mm wide.
It flowers in spikes which are to 12 cm long. The  bracts are leaf-like. The sepals are about 1 mm long and joined at the base. The mauve to pale pink or white corolla is 8–16 mm long, and is hairy,  with ±appressed hairs outside and  densely bearded inside. The ovary has two locules The fruit is obovoid, up to 4 mm long, and is hairy.

References

External links
Scaevola amblyanthera: Occurrence data from Australasian Virtual Herbarium

amblyanthera
Flora of Australia
Taxa named by Ferdinand von Mueller